Gil Álvarez Carrillo de Albornoz more commonly Gil de Albornoz (– 23 August 1367),  was a Spanish curial cardinal, archbishop of Toledo from 13 May 1338 to 17 December 1350. Grand Penitentiary from December 1352 to August 23, 1364. Cardinal priest with the title of San Clemente from December 17, 1350 to December 1356. Cardinal bishop of Sabina from December 1356 to August 23, 1364. Cardinal legate and vicar general from 30 June 1353 to 1357, who led as condottiere Papal States mercenary armies in two campaigns to reconquer territory in Italy, and statesman. 

Albornoz was a descendant of the kings of León and Aragón and founder of the Collegio di Spagna, an academic institution of Bologna.

Life

Early life

He was born in late 1302 or early 1303, in Carrascosa del Campo, (Cuenca). He was raised and educated in Zaragoza, with his mother's brother, and studied law in Toulouse.

At the battle of Río Salado he successfully fought against a Marinid invasion from Morocco in 1340, and at the taking of Algeciras in 1344 he led the armed levy of his archbishopric. As Archbishop of Toledo he held two reform synods; one at Toledo in May 1339, the other at Alcalá in April 1347. In 1343 he had been sent to Pope Clement VI at Avignon to negotiate a grant of a tax on the revenues of the Church for the Crusade. Albornoz left Spain on the death of the king Alfonso XI in March 1350, and never returned. It has been said, but not on contemporary evidence, that he fled from fear of Pedro of Castile. His military and diplomatic ability became known to the pope, who made him a cardinal-priest of S. Clemente in December of that year, at which point he resigned the archbishopric of Toledo.

He was appointed grand penitentiary shortly after election of Pope Innocent VI in December 1352 and given the epithet "Angel of Peace", a title which quickly became an ironic misnomer given his future campaigns in the Papal States.

Campaigns

Italy

First
In 1353 Innocent VI sent him as a legate into Italy, with a view to the restoration of the papal authority in the states of the Church, at the head of a small mercenary army. After receiving the support of the archbishop of Milan, Giovanni Visconti, and of those of Pisa, Florence and Siena, he started a campaign against Giovanni di Vico, lord of Viterbo, who had usurped much of the Papal territories in the Latium and Umbria. Giovanni was defeated in the battle of Viterbo of 10 March 1354 and signed a treaty of submission. To mark his authority over Viterbo, he immediately decided to build a palace there near the San Faustino church.

Albornoz then moved to the Marche and Romagna against the Malatesta of Rimini and the Ordelaffi of Forlì. The Papal commander Rodolfo II da Varano, lord of Camerino, defeated Galeotto Malatesta, forcing his family to become a loyal ally of the Pope. This was followed by the submission of the Montefeltro of Urbino and the da Polenta of Ravenna, and of the cities of Senigallia and Ancona. Towards the end of 1356 Albornoz was appointed as bishop of Sabina.

Only Giovanni Manfredi of Faenza and Francesco II Ordelaffi of Forlì were at that point resisting the Papal reconquest. Albornoz had managed to submit only the former when he was being recalled in 1357, being replaced by Androin de la Roche, abbot of Cluny. Before leaving, in a meeting with all the Papal vicars held on 29 April 1357, Albornoz issued the Constitutiones Sanctæ Matris Ecclesiæ, which regulated all the matters of the Papal States and its division into provinces. They remained effective until 1816.

Second

The Cardinal was honoured as Pater Ecclesiæ at his arrival in Avignon. His sojourn there was to be short, however, as Giovanni di Vico and Francesco Ordelaffi (who had hired the famous condottiero Konrad von Landau's "Grand Company") were menacing the fragile balance of his last conquests. Returned to Italy, Albornoz found an agreement with Landau, forcing Ordelaffi to surrender on 4 July 1359. He then promulgates in the name of the pope the Constitutiones Sanctae Matri Ecclesiae, general regulations of the pontifical administration of the domain of Saint-Pierre.   

Albornoz missed only Bologna to complete his rebuilding of the Papal States. When that city was attacked by Bernabò Visconti of Milan, its ruler, Giovanni d'Oleggio, decided to hand it over to Albornoz. In the meantime, Innocent died: the Spanish cardinal refused the tiara, and Urban V was elected. Under him Albornoz started the military campaign against Visconti and, when all attacks failed, Urban proclaimed a crusade against him.

As Urban's greatest desire was that of a crusade against the Turks, the two parts signed a hasty peace, which was highly favourable to Visconti. The relentless work of Albornoz ushered in a decade of warfare and atrocity culminating in the massacre of Cesena, a town faithful to the Papal cause whose entire population was executed by the Papal forces while paving the way of Urban V to Rome (1367).

As legate, Albornoz showed himself to be an astute manager of men and effective fighter. He began by making use of Cola di Rienzo (former leader of the citizenship freedom in Rome), whose release from prison at Avignon he secured. After the murder of the tribune in 1354 Albornoz pursued his task of restoring the pope's authority by intrigue and force with remarkable success. However, the ten years of bloody warfare conducted by Albornoz accomplished very little to secure the pacification of Italy for now four mercenary companies roved through Italy spreading further bloodshed and strife. The Papal State was itself far from completely pacified; a savage and devastating war went on from 1361 to 1367 between Rome and Velletri while in 1366-7 there was a general rebellion in Campagna. Despite all and as a mark of gratitude the pope appointed him legate at Bologna in 1367, but he died at Viterbo the same year. According to his own desire his remains were carried to Toledo, where Henry of Castile had them entombed with almost royal honours.

The college of Saint Clement at Bologna was founded by Albornoz for the benefit Castilian, Aragonese and Portuguese students, in 1364.

Archbishop
He was elected archbishop of Toledo by the cathedral chapter to succeed his uncle Jimeno de Luna. The election was confirmed by Pope Benedict XII by decree of the Pontifical Foreign Ministry given in Avignon on 13 May 1338, in which he is mentioned as Deacon, Archdian of the Order of Calatrava, Pontifical Chaplain and Doctor of Decrees.

See also
Avignon Papacy
Constitutiones Sanctæ Matris Ecclesiæ
Papal States
War of the Eight Saints
History of Rome
Cola di Rienzo

Notes

References

Works

Bibliography

Further reading

External links

 
 Sources of Juan Ginés de Sepúlveda about G. Albornoz

1310 births
1367 deaths
14th-century Castilian cardinals
Cardinal-bishops of Sabina
Spanish politicians
Archbishops of Toledo
14th-century Roman Catholic archbishops in Castile
Major Penitentiaries of the Apostolic Penitentiary